Intetumumab is a human monoclonal antibody targeting integrins that was being studied for the treatment of solid tumors.

Intetumumab was developed by Centocor, Inc.

Phase II clinical trials for treatment of melanoma and prostate cancer were in progress when development of the drug was discontinued.

References 

Janssen Biotech
Experimental cancer drugs